is a Japanese manga series written and illustrated by Ao Akato. Akato launched two previous manga in Kodansha's Monthly Afternoon; Nemesis no Tsue, published in 2013, and In Hand: Himokura Hakase to Majime na Migiude, published in 2016. In Hand was serialized in Kodansha's Evening from October 2018 to November 2020, with its chapters collected in five tankōbon volumes. An eleven-episode Japanese television drama adaptation was broadcast on TBS from April to June 2019.

Media

Manga
Before creating In Hand, Ao Akato launched a short manga series, titled , which ran in Kodansha's Monthly Afternoon from January 25 to June 25, 2013, and its chapters were collected in a single tankōbon volume, released on September 30, 2013. A three-chapter prologue miniseries, titled , was serialized in Monthly Afternoon from March 25 to May 25, 2016. and its chapters were collected in a single tankōbon volume, released on July 22, 2016. 

In Hand was serialized in Kodansha's Evening from October 23, 2018, to November 24, 2020. Kodansha collected its chapters in five tankōbon volumes, released from March 22, 2019, to February 22, 2021.

Volume list

Drama
In Hand was adapted into a 11-episode Japanese television drama, which was broadcast on TBS from April 12 to June 21, 2019.<ref></p></ref>

See also
Riū wo Machinagara — Another manga series by the same author.

References

External links
 
 

Kodansha manga
Japanese medical television series
Medical anime and manga
Seinen manga
Suspense anime and manga
TBS Television (Japan) original programming